Central Jersey College Prep Charter School is a comprehensive public charter elementary / middle / high school that serves students in kindergarten through twelfth grade, located in the Somerset section of Franklin Township, in Somerset County, New Jersey, United States. The school operates under the terms of a charter granted by the New Jersey Department of Education granted in 2006.  In addition to students from Franklin Township, the school also serves students from the neighboring communities of New Brunswick and North Brunswick Township in Middlesex County, New Jersey, United States.

As of the 2021–22 school year, the school had an enrollment of 1,277 students and 107.7 classroom teachers (on an FTE basis), for a student–teacher ratio of 11.9:1. There were 232 students (18.2% of enrollment) eligible for free lunch and 84 (6.6% of students) eligible for reduced-cost lunch.

Awards, recognition and rankings
In 2016, the school was one of ten schools in New Jersey, and the only charter school, recognized as a National Blue Ribbon School by the United States Department of Education.

Extracurricular activities
Clubs and activities offered at the school include Model United Nations, Newspaper Club, Science Olympiad, Chess Club, Debate Club, Year Book, Art Club, Guitar Club, Band, Chorus, Writing Workshop (Middle / High), Math Club, Robotics Club (Middle / High), Turkish Club, Chinese Club, Spanish Club, Computer Science Club, National Junior Honor Society, National Honor Society, Soccer Club, Basketball Club, and the Volleyball Club.

Athletics
The Central Jersey College Prep Charter School Cougars participate in interscholastic sports including men's basketball, men's soccer and men's and women's volleyball, competing independently of any conference under the auspices of the New Jersey State Interscholastic Athletic Association (NJSIAA). With 136 students in grades 10-12, the school was classified by the NJSIAA for the 2019–20 school year as Group I for most athletic competition purposes, which included schools with an enrollment of 75 to 476 students in that grade range.

Administration
The school's Chief Education Officer is Dr. Namik Sercan.

References

External links 
Central Jersey College Prep Charter School

Data for Central Jersey College Prep Charter School, National Center for Education Statistics

Franklin Township, Somerset County, New Jersey
2006 establishments in New Jersey
Charter schools in New Jersey
Educational institutions established in 2006
Public high schools in Somerset County, New Jersey
Public middle schools in New Jersey